The 2024 United States Senate election in Wisconsin will be held on November 5, 2024, to elect a member of the United States Senate to represent the state of Wisconsin. Incumbent two-term Democratic Senator Tammy Baldwin was re-elected with 55.4% of the vote in 2018.

Background 
A typical swing state, Wisconsin is considered to be a purple state at the federal level, especially since there is are both a Republican and Democrat senator representing the state and that in the 2020 presidential election, Joe Biden carried Wisconsin by less than 1 percentage point. Both parties have seen success in the state in recent years. However, Democrats have seen success in statewide races including in 2022 where incumbent governor Tony Evers won by a larger margin than most expected.

Baldwin was first elected in 2012, defeating former governor Tommy Thompson by 6 percentage points and was re-elected in 2018 by 11 percentage points.

This race is supposed to be competitive given the state's nearly even partisan lean, however, most analysts consider Baldwin to be a slight favorite to win reelection.

Democratic primary

Candidates

Publicly expressed interest
Tammy Baldwin, incumbent U.S. Senator

Republican primary

Candidates

Publicly expressed interest
 Eric Hovde, hedge fund manager and candidate for U.S. Senate in 2012
 Scott Mayer, staffing executive

Potential
 Rachel Campos-Duffy, Fox News host and wife of former U.S. Representative Sean Duffy
 David Clarke, former Democratic Milwaukee County Sheriff (2002–2017)
 Rebecca Kleefisch, former Lieutenant Governor of Wisconsin (2011–2019) and candidate for Governor of Wisconsin in 2022
 Kevin Nicholson, businessman, former member of the Wisconsin Board of Veterans Affairs, and candidate for U.S. Senate in 2018

Declined 

 Scott Walker, former Governor of Wisconsin (2011–2019)

General election

Predictions

References

2024
Wisconsin
United States Senate